Bandwan is a census town in the Bandwan CD block in the Manbazar subdivision of the Purulia district in the state of West Bengal, India.

Geography

Location

Area overview
Purulia district forms the lowest step of the Chota Nagpur Plateau. The general scenario is undulating land with scattered hills. Manbazar subdivision, shown in the map alongside, is located in the eastern part of the district. It is an overwhelmingly rural subdivision with 96.32% of the population living in the rural areas and 3.68% living in the urban areas. There are 3 census towns in the subdivision. The map shows the Kangsabati Project Reservoir. The Mukutmanipur Dam is in Bankura district but the upper portion of the reservoir is in Manbazar subdivision. The remnants of old temples and deities are found in the subdivision also, as in other parts of the district. The subdivision has a very high proportion of Scheduled Castes and Scheduled Tribes. Bandwan CD block has 51.86% ST population, Manbazar II CD block has 48.97% ST population. Manbazar I CD block has 22.03% ST and 22.44% SC. Puncha CD block has 24.74% ST and 14.54 SC. Writing in 1911, H. Coupland, ICS, speaks of the aboriginal races largely predominating in the old Manbhum district. He particularly mentions the Kurmis, Santhals, Bhumij and Bauri.

Note: The map alongside presents some of the notable locations in the subdivision. All places marked in the map are linked in the larger full screen map.

Demographics
As per 2011 Census of India Bandwan had a total population of 5,993 of which 3,112 (52%) were males and 2,881 (48%) were females. Population below 6 years was 692. The total number of literates in Bandwan was 4,131 (77.93% of the population over 6 years).

Civic administration

Police station
Bandwan police station has jurisdiction over the Bandwan CD block. The area covered is 367.08 km2 and the population covered is 95,002. It has 52.44 km of inter-state border with Galudih, Patamda and Kamalpur police stations in East Singhbhum district of Jharkhand.

CD block HQ
The headquarters of the Bandwan CD block are located at Bandwan.

Infrastructure
According to the District Census Handbook 2011, Puruliya, Bandwan covered an area of 3.6145 km2. Among the civic amenities, it had 5 km roads with both open and covered drains, the protected water supply involved overhead tank, tap water from treated sources, tank/pond/lake. It had 1,235 domestic electric connections, 218 road light points. Among the educational facilities it had were 9 primary schools, 3 senior secondary schools. Among the social, recreational and cultural facilities, it had 1 stadium, 1 auditorium/ community hall, 1 public library, 1 reding room. Three important commodities it produced were bakery products, puffed rice, pot making. It had branches of 1 nationalised bank, 1 non-agricultural credit society.

Transport
SH 5 running from Rupnarayanpur (in Bardhaman district) to Junput (in Purba Medinipur district) passes through Bandwan. The road from Bandwan to Mahulia, on NH 18, in East Singhbhum district of Jharkhand, and the Barabazar-Bandwan Road meets SH 5 at Bandwan. SBSTC has a bus depot at Bandwan.

Education
Bandwan Mahavidyalaya at Bandwan is a government aided private college at village: Chilla, PO Jitan. It is affiliated to Sidho Kanho Birsha University. It offers courses in B.A. honours in Bengali, English , Sanskrit, Santhali, Political Science ,  history, Education and B.A. pass.

Healthcare
Bandwan Rural Hospital, with 30 beds, is a major government medical facility in Bandwan CD block.

References

Cities and towns in Purulia district